The Qatar Central Bank is the central bank of Qatar.

Originally known as the Qatar Monetary Agency it was founded in 1973.

Over its history the Qatar Central Bank has increasingly worked in association with other, larger central banks to achieve a stable currency for the country, most recently and notably with the Monetary Authority of Singapore.

History
The Qatar Central Bank was originally until 1993 known as the Qatar Monetary Agency (and was known before that as Qatar Dubai Currency Board), founded on May 13, 1973 after Dubai joined the United Arab Emirates and disengaged itself from British monetary policy which the area had previously followed.  The Qatar Monetary Agency assumed the duties of a central bank. In 1973, Amiri Decree No. 24 authorized the issuance of the Qatari Riyal (QR).

Objectives  
Article no. 5 of the Law of the Qatar Central Bank and the Regulation of financial Institutions issued by Law no. 13 of 2012 states the central bank's objectives for Qatar's economic policy:
 Preserve money value and assure monetary stability.
 Act as a regulatory, control and supervisory higher authority for all the services, business, markets and financial activities inside or though the state of Qatar in accordance with the best international standards and practices.
 Establish a stable, transparent, competitive and governance sector for carrying out services, business, markets and financial activities based on market rules.
 Reinforce public confidence in Qatar as a pioneering global hub for services, business, markets and financial activities. 
 Ensure consistent development of services, markets and financial activities sector in line with the objectives of economic and comprehensive development in Qatar.

In addition, the Qatar Central Bank serves the primary roles of many central banks. These roles are stated in Article no. 6, 7, and 8 of Law no. 13 and include (among others) the following duties:
 Stability of QR exchange rate and its capacity of being exchanged for other currencies.
 Cash issuance and regulation of its circulation.
 Act as a bank for all the banks and financial institutions in Qatar.
 Financial and Banking stability. 
 Administer and invest its money and reserves. 
 Lay out regulations, instructions and guidance on governance, transparency and sound management in all financial institutions under QCB's supervision.

Leadership 
The Board of Directors of the Qatar Central Bank is composed of five members. The Governor and Chairman of the Board of Directors is Bandar bin Mohamed bin Saud al-Thani.

Governors

Controversy 
A former employee of the Qatar Central Bank, Khalifa Muhammad Turki al-Subaiy, is considered by the US as a Specially Designated Global Terrorist.

In 2008, the U.S. Department of State described Al-Subaiy as a “Qatar-based terrorist financier and facilitator” for working with al-Qaeda senior leadership, including Khalid Sheikh Mohammed described as “the principal architect of the 9/11 attacks” in the 9/11 Commission Report. Al-Subaiy provided financial assistance to senior al-Qaeda members in Pakistan and helped extremists reach al-Qaeda training camps in Pakistan.

In 2008, the Bahrain High Criminal Court convicted al-Subaiy in absentia for charges of financing terrorism. In March 2008, al-Subaiy was arrested in Qatar but released after six months in September 2009.

In a 2014 U.S. Department of Treasury designation of foreign terrorist fighter facilitators, al-Subaiy was described as working with two al-Qaeda financial facilitators in order to transfer “hundreds of thousands of dollars” and “tens of thousands of dollars” to al-Qaeda and the Al-Nusra Front. Qatar signed a memorandum of understanding on combating terror finance with the U.S. and also reformed its 2004 anti-terrorism law according to The Washington Institute for Near East Policy in June 26, 2017. Qatari Foreign Minister Sheikh Mohammed bin Abdulrahman signed the memorandum of understanding (MOU) on countering terrorist financing. It outlined a number of steps that the U.S. and Qatari governments will each take in the coming months and years to further dismantle terrorist financing networks and address global terrorist activities more broadly. As part of the agreement, U.S. officials will be posted at the Qatari prosecutor’s office. The report also revealed that in 2004, Qatar passed a law criminalizing terror financing, established a Financial Intelligence Unit (FIU), and founded the Qatari Authority for Charitable Activities (QACA). The Law on Combating Terrorism gave the state the authority to prosecute individuals involved in terrorist activities, including providing material support, training and financing extremist groups.

According to a November 2014 report by the Telegraph, al-Subaiy is living freely in Doha.

See also

 Qatari riyal
 Economy of Qatar

References

External links
  Official site: Qatar Central Bank

Banks of Qatar
Qatar
Banks established in 1973
Companies based in Doha
Qatari companies established in 1973